Brian O'Neill (born June 1, 1988) is an American professional ice hockey forward for EV Zug of the National League (NL).

Playing career
Undrafted, O'Neill played collegiate hockey with Yale University of the ECAC before signing a one-year entry-level contract with the Los Angeles Kings at the conclusion of his senior year on March 15, 2012. and was assigned to the Manchester Monarchs.

In the 2014–15 season, his third full season within the Kings organization, O'Neill was assigned to continue to play with the Manchester Monarchs of the AHL. He enjoyed a breakout year offensively with the Monarchs, leading the team and the league with 58 assists and 80 points in 71 games to be awarded the Les Cunningham Award as the AHL's most valuable player. In the post-season, O'Neill's continued his offensive pace in recording 10 goals and 20 points to help the Monarchs dominate the league and capture the Calder Cup in their final season in the AHL.

Before the 2015–16 season, O'Neill attended the Kings training camp and participated in the pre-season. O'Neill was unable to earn a roster spot in Los Angeles, and as a result, on the eve of the season, on October 6, 2015, the Kings traded O'Neill to the New Jersey Devils in return for a conditional 7th-round pick. O'Neill made his NHL debut with the Devils on October 10, 2015, against the Washington Capitals. He played 22 games in the NHL for the Devils that season and also made 42 appearances for their AHL affiliate Albany Devils.

On May 20, 2016, he signed a deal with Helsinki-based club Jokerit of the Kontinental Hockey League (KHL). In December 2020, O'Neill, dubbed "Mr. Helsinki", signed a new three-year contract with Jokerit.

O'Neill was an offensive catalyst for six years in Jokerit before the club withdrew from the KHL during the 2021–22 season due to the Russian invasion of Ukraine.

As a free agent, O'Neill opted to continue his career abroad, agreeing to a two-year contract with Swiss club EV Zug of the NL on May 6, 2022.

Career statistics

Regular season and playoffs

International

Awards and honors

References

External links
 

1988 births
Living people
AHCA Division I men's ice hockey All-Americans
Albany Devils players
American expatriate sportspeople in Finland
American men's ice hockey forwards
Chicago Steel players
Ice hockey players at the 2018 Winter Olympics
Ice hockey players at the 2022 Winter Olympics
Ice hockey players from Pennsylvania
Jokerit players
Manchester Monarchs (AHL) players
New Jersey Devils players
Olympic ice hockey players of the United States
People from Yardley, Pennsylvania
Sportspeople from Bucks County, Pennsylvania
Undrafted National Hockey League players
Yale Bulldogs men's ice hockey players
EV Zug players